Hahnemann is a German surname. Notable people with the surname include:
 Elizabeth Cuthill, née Elizabeth Hahnemann (1923–2011), American mathematician
 Helga Hahnemann (1937–1991), East German actress
 Marcus Hahnemann (born 1972), American soccer player
 Mélanie Hahnemann (1800–1878), French physician
 Paul G. Hahnemann (1912–1997), German automobile industry manager
 Samuel Hahnemann (1755−1843), German physician, founder of homeopathy
 Wilhelm Hahnemann (1914−1991), Austrian-German football player and coach

See also 
 Hahnemann University Hospital, Philadelphia
 Hahnemann University, Philadelphia-based institution, precursor to Drexel University College of Medicine
 Hanneman
 Hahnaman, Illinois

German-language surnames